The Jersey Shore Wildcats were a Tier III Junior "A" ice hockey team from Wall Township, New Jersey. They were a members of the International Junior Hockey League, Northern States Hockey League, North American 3 Eastern Hockey League, and the North American 3 Hockey League. The organization continued to operate teams at the youth level.

History
The team was founded in 2009 as the Trenton Habs and joined the International Junior Hockey League (IJHL) for the 2008–09 season as an associate member, playing a season of exhibition games against IJHL teams as well as participating in league showcase and national championship tournament. The team joined the IJHL as a full member for the 2010–11 season in the IJHL's Jr. Super Elite League. The Habs finished the 2009–10 season winning the IJHL Super Elite National Championship. In the summer of 2012, the IJHL folded causing the Habs and many former teams of the IJHL Super Elite Division to form the Northern States Hockey League (NSHL) under the AAU.

In May 2013, it was announced that the organization joined forces with the Wichita Falls Wildcats of the North American Hockey League to give players more opportunities and exposure and renamed the team the Jersey Shore Wildcats.

In 2014, the NSHL left AAU sanctioning with the intention of joining USA Hockey. The Tier II North American Hockey League (NAHL) then took over operations during the 2014–15 season and changed the name of the league to the North American 3 Eastern Hockey League (NA3EHL). Prior to the 2016–17 season, the Wildcats became part of the North American 3 Hockey League (NA3HL) when it absorbed the NA3EHL.

In 2017, their NAHL affiliate, the Wichita Falls Wildcats, folded during the offseason. The Jersey Shore Wildcats continued into the 2017–18 NA3HL season, but games were cancelled in mid-November 2017. By December, the team was removed from the league due to apparently owing the league compensation even though the team was in second place in their division at the time.

Season-by-season records

United Hockey Union Nationals
AAU Sanctioned Junior A National Championship
In 2013 & 2014, the MWJHL, NSHL, & WSHL advanced two teams each.

References

External links
 Official Team Website
 Official Team Arena

Ice hockey teams in New Jersey
Sports in Trenton, New Jersey
2009 establishments in New Jersey
Ice hockey clubs established in 2009
Monmouth County, New Jersey
2017 disestablishments in New Jersey
Ice hockey clubs disestablished in 2017